Green House Data, now known as Lunavi, was a data center and managed services provider headquartered in Cheyenne, Wyoming, United States that rebranded as Lunavi in 2020.

Cheyenne is home to a campus with 45,000 square feet of data center space, as well as administrative and technical support offices. The company has additional data center locations in Washington, Colorado, Oregon, Georgia, Texas, New Jersey, and New York, with sales and marketing offices in Laramie and in Denver, Colorado. As of 2019, the company also operates an IT consulting focused office in Toronto, Ontario.

History 
In 2007, three friends hatched the idea for a data center powered exclusively by renewable energy over coffee and soon after began the process of retrofitting a former office building to provision 3000 square feet of colocation space. By March 2012, Green House Data had doubled the footprint in the Cheyenne location, added cloud hosting products, and expanded its footprint to the west coast. In December 2013, an east coast expansion was announced, and by August 2013, the company had broken ground on a new facility in Cheyenne. The second Cheyenne location officially opened on July 30, 2014. In September 2014, 1547 Critical Systems Realty and Green House Data announced that the company would be an anchor tenant in a redevelopment at 1 Ramland Road in Orangeburg, New York.

In April 2015, the company acquired FiberCloud, a Seattle, Washington-based provider of colocation, cloud hosting, and other data center services. With this acquisition, Green House Data added three data centers in Washington state, as well as nearly 20 employees and several hundred customers.

In April 2017, the company acquired Cirracore, a cloud-focused infrastructure provider based in Atlanta, Georgia. In November 2017, the company acquired Ajubeo, a cloud hosting service provider based in Denver.

Green House Data announced a merger via acquisition of Infront Consulting Group in May 2018, expanding operations to Toronto and Las Vegas, as well as other satellite sites, while adding over 30 IT consulting staff focusing on Microsoft Azure, cloud automation, and IT consulting.

Emerging markets
The company is part of a new surge in data center construction in the Cheyenne region and across the Rocky Mountains. Cheyenne has been ranked as a top 5 location for data centers, with Microsoft, Echostar, and the National Center for Atmospheric Research all operating facilities in the city.

In addition, Green House Data's most facility in Orangeburg represents entry into the Rockland County market, which is just beginning to emerge as a new data center cluster. It is home to facilities operated by both Bloomberg L.P. and Verizon.

Everett and Bellingham, Washington represent markets on the I-5 Corridor that have been historically underserved.

Sustainable energy 
As a whole, the data center industry has been highly criticized for heavy electrical use, and in recent years has actively tried to reduce power consumption by improving facility design and increasing server virtualization. As a key element of their business model, Green House Data purchases renewable energy credits, or RECs, for wind power and documents purchases with the EPA's Green Power Partnership. In 2013, Green House Data was part of EPA's "Leadership Club" for sustainable power purchases. A common measure for data center power consumption is Power usage effectiveness, often abbreviated PUE.

Beginning in 2014, Green House Data was the first company to participate in WyoRECs, the first renewable energy credit program based out of Wyoming.

In April 2015, Green House Data joined the EPA's Top 30 Tech & Telecom list of the largest green power users, retiring over 8 million kilowatt-hours (kWh) of green power annually. By 2017, the company moved up 5 places on the list, retiring 20,270,000 kWhs.

NPR's All Things Considered called Green House Data's energy efficiency an "obsession."

Compliance 
In July 2011, the company's cloud and colocation facilities achieved SSAE 16 Type II Compliance. Additionally, in 2012, Green House Data achieved HIPAA IT compliance.

Data Centers 
Green House Data operates a total of seven data center facilities in five geographic regions. There are cloud and colocation data centers in Atlanta, GA, Cheyenne, WY, Seattle, WA, and Bellingham, WA and cloud data centers in Dallas, TX, Denver, CO, and Orangeburg, NY.  Each location is carrier neutral, fully compliant to HIPAA and SSAE 16 Type II standards, and comes with guaranteed uptime service level agreements. In March 2016, the company announced a "Hear from a Human" technical support service guarantee, which Fortune called more characteristic of a "boutique cloud."

The Seattle facility is located within the Westin Building, the 3rd largest carrier hotel in the United States. The Westin Building data center consists of the 18th, 19th, and 32nd floors, with participation in the Seattle Internet Exchange.

In the news 
Green House Data became one of a select group of Azure Expert MSPs, an independently certified audit that demonstrates exceptional proficiency and abilities within the Microsoft Azure ecosystem, in April 2019.

In late 2017, Green House Data acquired Assuritive, a Disaster Recovery as a Service provider. In November 2017, Green House Data acquired Ajubeo, a Denver-based cloud hosting service provider, bringing the company's total cloud node locations up to ten. Earlier that year, Green House Data acquired Cirracore, an Atlanta-based provider of enterprise cloud services, expanding the company's reach to the southeast United States.

Green House Data acquired FiberCloud, a West Coast Data Center company, in April 2015 gaining three Washington facilities in Seattle, Everett, and Bellingham.

In February 2015, Green House Data was recognized in the Top 500 MSP by CRN Magazine for the Second Consecutive Year

In October 2014, Green House Data was recognized as a Top 100 Cloud Services Provider by Talkin' Cloud, making the list for the second consecutive time. In February 2014, Green House Data was recognized as a Top 500 Managed Service Provider by CRN Magazine. In 2014, Green House Data became the first B Corp in Wyoming.

Green House Data CTO Cortney Thompson was interviewed as part of a Marketplace radio piece by Wyoming Public Media covering government IT departments moving to cloud services and data centers.

In August 2014, the State of Wyoming was announced as the first anchor tenant in Green House Data's second Cheyenne facility.

References

External links 
 

Cloud computing providers
Sustainable energy
Web hosting
Companies based in Cheyenne, Wyoming
Computer companies established in 2007